David Cane may refer to:

David E. Cane, American biological chemist
David Cane (footballer), see 2011–12 Scottish Cup

See also
David Cain (disambiguation)
David Kane (disambiguation)